Eugene Hughes (born 5 May 1969) is a UK-based documentary filmmaker and psychotherapist. He is known for the documentary film The Moving Theatre, as well as for establishing Artgym.

Hughes has also lectured at universities in the UK and the United States.

Early life and education
Hughes was born on 5 May 1969 in Dublin, Ireland. In 1990 he received a bachelor of arts degree from University College Dublin. In 2000, he completed his master's degree in psychotherapy from London Metropolitan University.

In 2009, he completed his master's degree in integrative arts psychotherapy from the Institute of Arts in Therapy and Education. Later, in 2019, he completed his Ph.D. at the University of the Arts, Philadelphia. His Ph.D. research subject was the psychology of being in nature.

Career
Hughes started his career in London in the 1990s before training as a psychologist and psychotherapist. In 2004, he became the founder and chief psychologist of Artgym, an organization that provides coaching on creative skills.

In 2010, Hughes became a clinical psychotherapist, providing individual psychotherapy and workshops in private clinical practice. In 2011, he co-founded Lead Like a River, a wilderness retreat that has been ranked in the Times and SELF magazine.

Hughes has researched and introduced creative techniques for personal development, including using embodied imagery in nature, the universal theory of archetypes, and adapting the Tibetan tradition of mandala-making to map individual values. He is currently a clinically trained and certified psychotherapist and art psychotherapist.

Films
In 2016, Hughes directed The Moving Theatre, a documentary using art to share people's migration experiences. He also ran art projects for communities to help with social inclusion.

In 2019, Hughes's documentary, The Moving Theatre, won several international awards in Asia, Europe, the Middle East, and the US, including Best Documentary at The National Film Awards UK, Indian Independent Film Festival, and London Independent Film Festival. His community art projects are exhibited at The Centre for Social Change and Kingston Museum in London.

Affiliations
Hughes is registered with the UK Council for Psychotherapy, the Health Care Professions Council, and the British Association of Art Therapy.

References

External links

Artgym

Living people
1969 births
Irish filmmakers
Psychotherapists